Violet is a census-designated place (CDP) in St. Bernard Parish, Louisiana, United States. The population was 5,758 at the 2020 census.

History
The area now known as Violet was originally part of the Livaudais Plantation. Violet sprang up after the development of the Violet Canal. It was named by canal booster Albert Covington Janin, after his wife Violet Blair Janin, a Washington, D.C. socialite and part of the influential Blair family for whom the Blair House across from the White House in Washington D.C. is named. Albert Janin spent his youth in St. Bernard Parish in the large Janin family home.  His father, Louis Janin, Sr., a prominent lawyer  who had immigrated from France to New Orleans in 1828, sent his sons to Europe for their education, including Albert. Albert was a partner with his father's law firm, including the office in Washington, D. C., where he remained after marrying into the Blair family.  His and Violet's life together is told in Virginia Jean Laas's book, Love and Power in the Nineteenth Century, the Marriage of Violet Blair.

Hurricane Katrina
On August 29, 2005, the community was devastated by storm surge and wind associated with Hurricane Katrina which topped the Hurricane Protection Levee and destroyed the Mississippi River-Gulf Outlet Canal (MRGO) levee. Camp Hope housed volunteers assisting residents of St. Bernard Parish in their recovery from Hurricane Katrina. It was located at the W. Smith Elementary School, 6701 E. St. Bernard Highway.

Geography
Violet is located at  (29.901244, -89.896860), in southern Louisiana on the Gulf Coast. According to the United States Census Bureau, the CDP has a total area of 4.5 square miles (11.8 km), of which 4.1 square miles (10.5 km) is land and 0.5 square mile (1.2 km) (10.57%) is water.

Demographics

At the 2000 United States census, there were 8,555 people, 2,744 households, and 2,266 families residing in the CDP. After Hurricane Katrina struck in 2005, the 2010 U.S. census determined its population declined to 4,973. The 2019 American Community Survey estimated its population rebounded to 5,755. In 2020, its population was 5,758. Among its population, the median age was 37.7, and 73.8% of the population were aged 18 and older. An estimated 6.6% were aged 5 and under, and 13.3% aged 65 and older.

The racial and ethnic makeup of the census-designated place was 64.5% Black and African American, 31.8% non-Hispanic white, 3.1% some other race, and 0.7% two or more races. Hispanic and Latin Americans of any race made up 7.6% of the population. In 2000, the racial makeup of the CDP was 58.29% White American, 38.77% African American, 0.48% Native American, 0.58% Asian, 0.01% Pacific Islander, 0.37% from other races, and 1.48% from two or more races. Hispanic and Latin Americans of any race were 4.29% of the population.

Approximately 8.2% of the population spoke a language other than English at home, and Spanish was the second most-spoken language at the 2019 census-estimates.

The median income for a household was $36,792 and 22.4% of the population lived at or below the poverty line. Males had a median income of $34,732 from 2015 to 2019, versus $23,643 for females. In 2000, the median income for a household in the CDP was $32,993, and the median income for a family was $36,616. Males had a median income of $32,012 versus $24,799 for females.

Notable people

Elmer R. Tapper, former member of the Louisiana House of Representatives

References

External links

Violet, Louisiana detailed profile

Census-designated places in St. Bernard Parish, Louisiana
Census-designated places in Louisiana
Census-designated places in New Orleans metropolitan area
Louisiana populated places on the Mississippi River